Lycopod may refer to a member of 
the lycophytes, defined broadly to include the extinct zosterophylls
the class Lycopodiopsida as defined in the Pteridophyte Phylogeny Group classification of 2016, extant lycophytes and their close extinct relatives
the family Lycopodiaceae, the clubmosses; the sole family in the order Lycopodiales
the genus Lycopodium